{{DISPLAYTITLE:C4H6S}}
The molecular formula C4H6S (molar mass: 86.16 g/mol, exact mass: 86.01902 u) may refer to:

 Dihydrothiophenes
 2,3-Dihydrothiophene
 2,5-Dihydrothiophene
 Divinyl sulfide

Molecular formulas